Bradford Girls' Grammar School is a free school for girls aged 5 – 16 and boys aged 5 – 11. Founded in 1875, the school is on the outskirts of Bradford city centre in West Yorkshire, England. Recent public examination results put the school top in Bradford and among the top three in Yorkshire. Bradford Girls has a debating society, which Barbara Castle attended when at the school.

Previously a private school, it became a free school in 2013, and no longer charges for admission.

An outline history of the school, with photographs, is available on the BGGS website. For many years, the school publication was known as The Chronicle. The school celebrated its centenary in 1975.

Head teachers
Miss Porter, Headmistress from 1875
Miss Stocker
Miss Roberts, 1894–1927
Miss Hooke, 1927–1955
Miss M.M. Black, 1955–1975
Miss R.M. Gleave, 1975–1986
Mrs L. Warrington, 1986–2009
Mrs K. Matthews, 2009–2020 
Mrs C Martin 2020-current

Notable former pupils

 Juliet Barker, British historian.
 Linda Barker, English interior designer and television presenter.
 Marion Bidder, British physiologist.
 Barbara Castle, Baroness Castle of Blackburn (1910-2002), British Labour Party politician.
 Katy Deacon, Young Woman Engineer of the Year 2007.
 Thangam Debbonaire, British Labour Party politician.
 Elizabeth Denby (1894–1965), English social housing expert and consultant.
 Anne Dyer, first female bishop in the Scottish Episcopal Church
 Ruby Ferguson (1899–1966), née Rubie Constance Ashby, writer of popular fiction, including children's books.
 Isabel Hilton, journalist.
 Jennifer Ingleheart, Professor of Latin at Durham University.
 Melanie Kilburn, English actress.
 Natalia Kills, English singer-songwriter.
 Julia Longbottom, diplomat
 Lizzie Mickery, British writer and former actress.
Dorothy, Miell, Academic.
 Anita Rani, English radio and television presenter, and journalist.
 Helene Reynard, Economist and college administrator.
Jo Shaw, Legal scholar
 Mary Tamm, Actress.
 Anna Watts, astrophysicist.

References

External links
 Bradford Girls' Grammar School web site

Schools in Bradford
Member schools of the Girls' Schools Association

Educational institutions established in 1875
1875 establishments in England
Secondary schools in the City of Bradford
Free schools in Yorkshire
Primary schools in the City of Bradford